John Murdoch (15 March 1882 – 17 August 1936) was an Australian politician.

He was born in Hobart, the son of James Murdoch, also a politician. In 1935 he was elected to the Tasmanian Legislative Council as the independent member for Pembroke following the death of his younger brother James. He served until his death the following year.

References

1882 births
1936 deaths
Independent members of the Parliament of Tasmania
Members of the Tasmanian Legislative Council
20th-century Australian politicians